Heydari (also Romanized as Ḩeydarī) is a village in Zayandeh Rud-e Jonubi Rural District, Ben County, Chaharmahal and Bakhtiari Province, Iran. At the 2006 census, its population was 1,650, in 418 families. The village is populated by Turkic people.

References 

Populated places in Ben County